Fernández, also known as Mataojo is a small populated centre in the eastern part of the  Salto Department of northwestern Uruguay.

Geography

History
One of the last massacres of the Charrúas, by a force led by Bernabé Rivera, happened in the area of Mataojo on 17 August 1831.

Ramón Mataojo was the name given to a Charrúan warrior of 18–20 years of age who was captured near the stream Arroyo Mataojo Grande in 1831. In January 1832, he was sent across the Atlantic as a living specimen for the Academy of Sciences of Paris. Due to disagreements of various officials, however, he had to remain on board the L’Emulatión, the ship that carried him, until his death in October of that year. He is credited as the first Charrúan to have crossed the Atlantic.

Population
Its population during the 2011 census was 305.

References

External links
 Map of Salto Department by the Instituto Nacional de Estadistica

Populated places in the Salto Department